The 1960 Denver Pioneers football team represented the University of Denver in the Skyline Conference during the 1960 NCAA University Division football season.  In their sixth season under head coach John Roning, the Pioneers compiled a 3–7 record (1–6 against Skyline opponents), tied for last place in the conference, and were outscored by a total of 300 to 133.

In January 1961, the University of Denver announced the cancellation of its football program. The program was operating at a net loss of $100,000 per year, and home attendance had dropped significantly.

Schedule

References

Denver
Denver Pioneers football seasons
Denver Pioneers football